The Bruiser Brody Memorial Cup was an annual professional wrestling memorial event produced by the World Wrestling Council (WWC) promotion, which was held from 2005 to 2006. The show was held in honor of Bruiser Brody who had been stabbed to death by Invader I backstage at a WWC show in Bayamón on July 16, 1988. It was the second memorial event held for Brody in Puerto Rico since the IWA Puerto Rico's Bruiser Brody Memorial Show in 2000, and the first time a Brody memorial show was held by the WWC.

The first Bruiser Brody Memorial Cup consisted of a three-day tour from July 15 to July 17, 2005 with shows at the Lenin Lopez Coliseum in Guayanilla, the Juan Ramón Loubriel Stadium in Bayamón, and the Wilfredo Toro Coliseum in Hormigueros, Puerto Rico. Nine professional wrestling matches were featured on the event's card for first two nights and seven on the final night. The main attraction was a two-ring, thirty-man "Bunkhouse Stampede" battle royal dedicated to Brody which was won by Sabu. Other featured matches included The Sandman defeating Sabu in a "hardcore" match and Full Impact Pro's The Market Crashers (Dow Jones and NASDAQ) beating Black Thunder and Chris Joel. Chris Joel defended the WWC Puerto Rican Championship against Eric Alexander, WWC World Tag Team Champions Joe Bravo and Vengador Boricua defeated The Market Crashers (Dow Jones and NASDAQ), and Eddie Colón won the WWC Universal Championship from Diamante in a Tables, Ladders, and Chairs match.

The Bruiser Brody Memorial Cup tour returned for a second year being held from June 23 to June 24, 2006, at the Frankie Colon Sports Complex Arena in Ponce and at the Pepín Cestero Arena in Bayamón, Puerto Rico. Eight professional wrestling matches were featured on both nights of the event's card, with five including championships. The main event for the first show was a tag team match which saw Eddie Colón and Shane defeating Black Pain and Orlando Jordan via disqualification. The second night's main event was the "Bruiser Brody Cup" battle royal which was won by Abbad after eliminating Abdullah the Butcher; Abbad had lost to Abdullah the Butcher in a Bloodfest match on the undercard. Other featured matches included WWC Junior Heavyweight Champion Brent Dail defeating Superstar Romeo, Black Rose defeated Lady Demonique for the WWC Women's Championship (with Stacey Colón as the special guest referee), Huracán Castillo and Chicky Starr defeating WWC World Tag Team Champions Tim Arson and Rico Suave by disqualification, and Alex Montalvo beating WWC Puerto Rico Heavyweight Champion El Bronco to win the title. A match for the then vacant WWC Universal Heavyweight Championship between Eddie Colón defeated Orlando Jordan, and refereed by Carlos Colón, ended in a no-contest when Colón was awarded the match by disqualification.

Although this marked the last Brody memorial tour, the promotion held one last "Bruiser Brody Cup" battle royal at the WWC 34th Anniversary Show in 2007 in which Fidel Sierra and Ricky Santana were declared the co-winners.

While these shows were not widely promoted outside Puerto Rico, the promotion received some criticism from the internet wrestling community. Brody biographer Emerson Murray, who interviewed WWC owner Carlos Colón while doing research for "Bruiser Brody" (2007), claimed that Colón "was tight-lipped but friendly" and, although having "nothing but good things to say about Brody", avoided talking about Brody's murder while promoting the then upcoming memorial show. The New Zealand Pro Wrestling Informer (NZPWI) website referred to the WWC as "the bastion of no-taste promoting" for holding one of the shows in the same stadium where Brody was killed as well as featuring Invader I on the card. In his review of the event, however, Armando Rodriguez of 411mania.com wrote that "the weeks surrounding the Bruiser Brody Memorial Cup where really exciting and full of good matches" and that the July 16th show of the 2005 Bruiser Brody Memorial Tour was "one of the best shows of the year". A few U.S. wrestlers, such as The Sheik and The Market Crashers (Dow Jones and NASDAQ), have considered their participation in the shows one of the highlights in their career.

Show results

First Annual Bruiser Brody Memorial Cup Tour (2005)

Bruiser Brody Memorial Cup Tour (Day 1)
July 15, 2005 in Guayanilla, Puerto Rico (Lenin Lopez Coliseum)

Bruiser Brody Memorial Cup Tour (Day 2)
July 16, 2005 in Bayamon, Puerto Rico (Juan Ramón Loubriel Stadium)

Bruiser Brody Memorial Cup Tour (Day 3)
July 17, 2005 in Hormigueros, Puerto Rico (Wilfredo Toro Coliseum)

Second Annual Bruiser Brody Memorial Cup Tour (2006)

Bruiser Brody Memorial Cup Tour (Day 1)
June 23, 2006 in Ponce, Puerto Rico (Frankie Colon Sports Complex Arena)

Bruiser Brody Memorial Cup Tour (Day 2)
June 24, 2006 in Bayamón, Puerto Rico (Pepín Cestero Arena)

See also

Professional wrestling in Puerto Rico

References

2005 in professional wrestling
2006 in professional wrestling
Professional wrestling memorial shows
Professional wrestling in Puerto Rico
World Wrestling Council